Abdul-Rahman Breesam Mohammed (born 1959) is an Iraqi wrestler who competed at the 1980 Summer Olympics and the 1984 Summer Olympics. He is also known as Abdul Rahman Mohammed or Abdul Breesam Rahman.

References

External links
 
 
 

1959 births
Living people
Place of birth missing (living people)
Iraqi male sport wrestlers
Olympic wrestlers of Iraq
Wrestlers at the 1980 Summer Olympics
Wrestlers at the 1984 Summer Olympics
Asian Games medalists in wrestling
Asian Games bronze medalists for Iraq
Wrestlers at the 1978 Asian Games
Medalists at the 1978 Asian Games